Money machine may refer to:
 "Money Machine" (song), a song by 100 Gecs
 "Money Machine", a song from the 2 Chainz album Based on a T.R.U. Story
 Money Machine, an album by Bigelf
 The Money Machine, an American investment-advice television program 1998–2001
 "The Money Machine", an episode of Mission:Impossible (1966 series)
 "Moneymachine", a song by Ho99o9 from the album United States of Horror

See also
 Automatic teller machine, used for withdrawing money from a bank account
 Money booth, used for entertainment